The following are the scheduled events of sailing for the year 2018 throughout the world.

Events

Olympic classes events

World championships
30 July – 12 August: 2018 Sailing World Championships in Aarhus, Denmark

Sailing World Cup
15 October 2017 – 10 June 2018: 2018 Sailing World Cup
21–28 January: Sailing World Cup Miami in Miami, United States
Men's 470 winners: 
Women's 470 winners: 
Men's 49er winners: 
Women's 49er FX winners: 
Men's Finn winner: 
Men's Laser winner: 
Women's Laser Radial winner: 
Mixed Nacra 17 winners: 
Men's RS:X winner: 
Women's RS:X winner: 
22–29 April: Sailing World Cup Hyères in Hyères, France
3–10 June: Sailing World Cup Final in Marseille, France
9 September 2018 – 2019: 2019 Sailing World Cup
9–16 September: Sailing World Cup Enoshima in Enoshima, Japan

Asian championships
24–30 June: 2018 Asian Sailing Championship in Jakarta, Indonesia.

European championships
9–17 March: Finn European Championship in Cádiz, Spain
 : 
 : 
 : 
5–12 May: Laser European Championships in La Rochelle, France
Men's Laser
 : 
 : 
 : 
Women's Laser Radial
 : 
 : 
 : 
16–24 May: 470 European Championships in Burgas, Bulgaria
Men's 470
 : 
 : 
 : 
Women's 470
 : 
 : 
 : 
5–13 July: 49er & 49er FX European Championships & Nacra 17 European Championship in Gdynia, Poland
Men's 49er
 : 
 : 
 : 
Women's 49er FX
 : 
 : 
 : 
Mixed Nacra 17
 : 
 : 
 : 
19–25 August: RS:X European Championships in Sopot, Poland

North American championships
13–15 January: 470 North American Championships in Miami, United States
Men's 470
 : 
 : 
 : 
Women's 470
 : 
 : 
 : 
23–27 May: RS:X North American Championships in Cancún, Mexico
12–15 July: Laser North American Championship in Long Beach, United States

South American championships
22–25 February: 470 South American Championship in San Isidro, Argentina
1–4 March: RS:X South American Championships in Paracas, Peru
3–8 December: 49er & 49er FX South American Championships & Nacra 17 South American Championship in Florianópolis, Brazil

Other major events

Extreme Sailing Series
14 March – 2 December: 2018 Extreme Sailing Series
14–17 March: Act 1 in Muscat, Oman
24–27 May: GC32 World Championship in Lake Garda, Italy
14–17 June: Act 2 in Barcelona, Spain
5–8 July: Act 3 in Portugal
9–12 August: Act 4 in Saint Petersburg, Russia
24–27 August: Act 5 in Cardiff, United Kingdom
18–21 October: Act 6 in San Diego, United States
29 November – 2 December: Act 7 in Los Cabos, Mexico

Global Kite Sports Association

PWA World Tour
10–15 May: Fly! ANA Windsurf World Cup in Yokosuka, Japan
19–24 May: Korea
5–10 June: Costa Brava, Spain
13–20 June: Portugal
15–21 July: Gran Canaria, Spain
26 July – 4 August: Fuerteventura, Spain
5–11 August: Tenerife, Spain
28 September – 7 October: Mercedes-Benz World Cup in Sylt, Germany

Volvo Ocean Race
14 October 2017 – 30 June 2018: 2017–18 Volvo Ocean Race
2–19 January: Leg #4 from Melbourne, Australia to Hong Kong, China
27 & 28 January 2018: In-Port Race in Hong Kong, China
1 February: Leg #5 (non-scoring) from Hong Kong, China to Guangzhou, China
3 February: In-Port Race in Guangzhou, China
7 February: Leg #6 from Guangzhou, China to Auckland, New Zelanda
10 March: In-Port Race in Auckland, New Zealand
18 March: Leg #7 from Auckland, New Zealand to Itajaí, Brazil
20 April: In-Port Race in Itajaí, Brazil
22 April: Leg #8 from Itajaí, Brazil to Newport, United States
19 May: In-Port Race in Newport, United States
20 May: Leg #9 from Newport, United States to Cardiff, United Kingdom
8 June: In-Port Race in Cardiff, United Kingdom
10 June: Leg #10 from Cardiff, United Kingdom to Gothenburg, Sweden
17 June: In-Port Race in Gothenburg, Sweden
21 June: Leg #11 from Gothenburg, Sweden to The Hague, Netherlands
30 June: In-Port Race in The Hague, Netherlands

Women's International Match Racing Series

World Match Racing Tour

Other classes

World championships
19–25 January: Contender World Championship in McCrae, Australia
 : 
 : 
 : 
25 March – 1 April: Moth World Championship in Hamilton, Bermuda
1–8 April: RS Feva World Championships in Clearwater, United States
1–8 July: RS:X World Youth Championships in Penmarch, France
14–22 July: Youth Sailing World Championships in Corpus Christi, United States
25–30 August: Finn Silver Cup in Koper, Slovenia
22–29 September: J/70 World Championship in Marblehead, United States
5–15 October: Star World Championship in Oxford, United States	
4–12 August: Techno 293 World Championships & Techno 293+ World Championships in Liepāja, Latvia
8–15 August: 420 World Championships in Newport, United States
12–25 August: International 14 World Championships in Richmond, United States

Asian championships
7–11 February: Techno 293+ Asian Championships in Singapore, Singapore

European championships
1–7 April: Techno 293+ European Championships in Mondello, Italy
7–14 April: One Metre European Championship in Rogoznica, Croatia
28 May – 1 June: Dragon European Championship in Balatonfüred, Hungary
3–11 July: 470 European Junior Championships & 420 European Junior Championships in Sesimbra, Portugal
8–13 July: Formula Kite European Championship in La Rochelle, France
7–12 August: Star European Championship in Flensburg, Germany
19–25 August: RS:X European Youth Championships in Sopot, Poland
29 August – 8 September: 6 Metre European Championship in La Trinité-sur-Mer, France
20–27 October: Techno 293 European Championships in Athens, Greece

North American championships
23–27 May: Techno 293+ North American Championships in Cancún, Mexico
4–8 July: Viper North American Championships in Kingston, Canada
14–19 August: Star North American Championship in Los Angeles, United States

South American championships
25–28 February: Techno 293+ South American Championships in Paracas, Peru
7–11 November: Star South American Championship in Rio de Janeiro, Brazil

Other events
30 March – 7 April: Trofeo Princesa Sofia in Palma, Spain
21–26 May: Medemblik Regatta in Medemblik, Netherlands
16–24 June: Kiel Week in Kiel, Germany
18 August – 2 September: 2018 Asian Games in Jakarta-Palembang, Indonesia
6–18 October: 2018 Summer Youth Olympics in Buenos Aires, Argentina
 3–8 December: Star Sailors League Finals in Nassau, Bahamas

References

 
Sailing by year
2018 sport-related lists